Joy Jittaun Moore is Professor of Biblical Preaching and serves as vice-president for Academic Affairs and Academic Dean at Luther Seminary in St. Paul, Minnesota.

Biography 
A native of Chicago, Moore grew up from South Side, Chicago. Her passion to teaching led her to earn a B.A. in Education and Mathematics at the National College of Education (National-Louis University) in 1982. She attended Commonwealth Community Church in Chicago and experienced a call to ministry there. She received an M.Div. at Garrett–Evangelical Theological Seminary in 1989. Having received a John Wesley Fellowship (2001-2005), she completed a Ph.D. in Practical Theology at Brunel University/London School of Theology in 2007.

Moore was the director of Student Life (1999-2001) at Asbury Theological Seminary. She was chaplain and director of Church Relations at Adrian College and has taught at Duke Divinity School. She was Assistant Professor of Preaching between 2012 and 2017 at Fuller Theological Seminary in Pasadena, CA and established its William E. Pannell Center for African American Church Studies in 2015. She was Associate Professor of Practical Theology at Wesley Seminary at Indiana Wesleyan University between 2017 and 2018. Prior to joining Luther Seminary, she has also pastored a historic African American United Methodist congregation in Flint, Michigan. She joined Luther Seminary as Professor of Biblical Preaching in 2019 and picked up the role of vice-president for Academic Affairs and Academic Dean in September 2019.

She is an ordained elder of the United Methodist Church and is President of the Wesleyan Theological Society.

References 

Living people
National Louis University alumni
Garrett–Evangelical Theological Seminary alumni
Alumni of the London School of Theology
Fuller Theological Seminary faculty
Duke University faculty
Indiana Wesleyan University faculty
Asbury Theological Seminary faculty
Adrian College faculty
African-American Methodists
20th-century African-American women
20th-century African-American people
21st-century African-American women
Year of birth missing (living people)